Vangelis Rinas is a Greek painter and sculptor. He was born on Samos in 1966, but grew up on Ikaria in the Northeastern Aegean Sea. He holds an MFA from the Athens School of Fine Arts and lives and works in Athens and New York City. Since 1992, he has done shows in Greece and abroad (including solo and group exhibitions) and participated in international biennales. These include his solo exhibition at the National Art Museum of China in Beijing and his latest solo show at Tenri Cultural Institute in New York. Since 2000, he has presented three solo exhibitions entitled "Endless Sailing". Some of his sculptures have been installed in the National Center for the Performing Arts in Beijing with Chinese ideograms and Braille writing.

Selected solo exhibitions
2012 Vangelis Rinas: Palimpsests of Time, Tenri Cultural Institute, New York, N.Y, USA
2012 Passages: Loss, Search and Ascent, Elga Wimmer PCC Gallery, New York, N.Y, USA
2010 Endless Sailing III, National Art Museum of China (NAMOC), Beijing, China
2010 Endless Sailing III, School of Fine Arts, Shanghai University, 99 Creative Center, Shanghai, China
2007 Endless Sailing II, Skoufa Gallery Athens, Greece 
2007 National Printing House of Greece Annual Calendar, Agathi Gallery, Athens, Greece  
2005 Children's Portraits, Agathi Gallery, Athens, Greece
2002 Endless Sailing II, Athinais Gallery, Athens, Greece
2002 Communication between Painting and Photography, Adam Gallery Athens, Greece 
2001 Water and Wind II, Adam Gallery, Athens, Greece
1998 Water and Wind I, Prisma Gallery, Livadia, Viotia, Greece
1993 First Reading, Maria Papadopoulou Gallery, Athens, Greece 
1992 Engraving, Miranda Gallery, Hyrda Island, Greece

Selected group exhibitions
2010 Environment Concern and Human Existence, Fourth Beijing International Art Biennale, China 2010, Beijing, China
2010 Taste of Brackishness II, Poseidonion Grand Hotel, Spetses island, Greece 
2010 With the Generation of 30s as a Springboard, the Great Art Studios and the descendαnts, Glikas Gallery, Athens, Greece
2009 Ambassadors of Contemporary Greek Art-Three Generations of Painters, Hellenic Museum, Melbourne, Australia
2009 Water Colouring the Landscape, curated by Iris Kritikou, Contemporary Balkan Art Gallery, Limnos Island, Greece
2009 Greek Visual Artists, Viannos Gallery, Basilica of Saint Mark, Heraklion, Creta Island, Greece
2009 Four Seasons, Hellenic War Museum, Athens, Greece 
2009 Modern Greek Landscape Painting from the 18th to the 21st Century - vision, experience and space regenerating, curated by B. Haris Kambouridis and M. Theocharakis Foundation for the Fine Arts and Music, Athens, Greece
2008 Greek Artists for the Human Rights, curated by the Human Rights Defense Center
2007 Visual Arts in Greece2007 - Artistic Innovation: Semiotics of its Terms in the New Age, State Museum of Contemporary Art, Salonika, Greece
2007 Dialogues 2007, Macedonian Museum of Contemporary Art, Salonika, Greece
2007 Greek Artists for the Human Rights, curated by the Human Rights Defense Center, The City of Athens Cultural Centre, Athens, Greece
2006 90 Greek Artists for the Human Rights, curated by the Human Rights Defense Center, The City of Athens Cultural Organization, Eleftherias Park Arts Centre, Athens, Greece 
2005 Shall we play?, Adam Gallery, Athens, Greece
2005 Art Works Exhibition, curated by the Human Rights Defense Center, The City of Athens Cultural Organization, Eleftherias Park Arts Centre Athens, Greece
2005 Agathi Gallery, Athens, Greece
2005 Vision and Touch, Atrion Gallery, Salonika, Greece 
2005 Sacred and Profane, aspects of the female in modern Greek painting 1930–2005, curated by Haris Kambouridis, Municipal Art Gallery of Chania, Creta Island, Greece
2003 Christmas with Greek and Russian Contemporary Art, K Gallery, London, Great Britain
2003 New Iconolatry, curated by Haris Kambouridis, Fine Arts Kapopoulos Gallery, Athens, Greece
2001 Visions and Bonds, The City of Athens Cultural Organization, Eleftherias Park Arts Centre, Athens, Greece
2001 Apollon Gallery, Rafina, Attica, Greece
1999 Anny Balta Gallery, Thessaloniki 
1998 Municipality of Corfu Gallery, Corfu Island, Greece  
1998 Trigono Gallery, Kifissia, Attica, Greece  
1997 Selini Gallery, Kifissia, Attica, Greece  
1994 Kostis Palamas Building, Athens, Greece
1994 A.Tassos Fine Arts Society, Athens, Greece
1992 Polyedro Gallery, Patra, Greece 
1992 Maria Papadopoulou Gallery, Athens, Greece
1992 Municipality of Vyronas Cultural Centre (Isadora Duncan), Vyronas, Athens
1991 Athens School of Fine Arts Graduates Exhibition, National Art Gallery and Alexander Soutzos Museum, Athens, Greece

Reviews
Jonathan Goodman, "Vangelis Rinas: The Art of Hybridity" Vangelis Rinas: Deterioration and Renewal", Tenri Cultural Institute, New York, N.Y., USA, 2012
Dr. Thalia Vrachopoulos, "Vangelis Rinas: Palimpsests of Time" Vangelis Rinas: Deterioration and Renewal", Tenri Cultural Institute, New York, N.Y., USA, 2012
Mary Hrbacek, "Painting in the Present Past", NY Arts, 23 June 2012
Dr. Thalia Vrachopoulos, "Vangelis Rinas' Passages: Loss, Search and Ascent" Vangelis Rinas Passages, May 2012
Liu Dawei, "He is sailing from the Aegean, First Personal Exhibition of the Greek Artist Vangelis Rinas in China", Endless Sailing III National Art Museum of China, March 2010
Harris Kambouridis, "In the Harmonious Sway of Myth," Endless Sailing III National Art Museum of China, March 2010
Annita Patsouraki, "Infinitive Voyage", Prayer for those who sail well in the seas," Vangelis Rinas; Endless Sailing II, 2007
Haris Kambouridis, "With Art as a Valuable Cargo," Vangelis Rinas; Endless Sailing II, 2007
Haris Kambouridis, "Molding the Clay with Color", Ta Nea, 28 December 2005
Dora Iliopoulou-Rogan, "Endless sailing," Vangelis Rinas: Endless Sailing, 2002
Nasa Patapiou, "I have ventured upon a great sea..." Vangelis Rinas: Endless Sailing, 2002
Haris Kambouridis, "Shipbuilding for the voyage of art," Vangelis Rinas: Endless Sailing, 2002
Dora Iliopoulou-Rogan, "Into the Inner Recesses" Vangelis Rinas, March 2001
Haris Kambouridis, "Spark of Resurrection", Ta Nea, 18 April 2001
Lena Pappa, "In a closed Room," Vangelis Rinas, March 1993

Bibliography
 Vangelis Rinas: Palimpsests of Time. Catalogue. New York, 2012
Vangelis Rinas Passages. Catalogue. New York: Elga Wimmer PCC Gallery, 2012
Zacharias Sokos, "Vangelis Rinas_The Painter", Apostrofos, Third program of Greek National Radio, 20 February 2012
Zacharias Sokos, "Vangelis Rinas_The Painter", Apostrofos, Ert webtv, ErtWorld, 26 February 2012
First Visit of the Opera of Beijing
The Album of the Fourth Beijing International Art Biennale, China 2010. Catalogue. Beijing China: People's Fine Arts Publishing House, 2010, 53
Nadia Soufli, "Vangelis Rinas" Hot Harbor, August 2010, 69–76 
Yiannis Moutsos, "Endless Sailing to China" Gentleman, July 2010, 110–111
Nikos Vatopoulos, "A wooden Boat to China" Kathimerini, 18 July 2010, 1
Annita Patsouraki, "Vangelis Rinas, Endless Sailing" The World of Metro, June 2010, no. 52, 7–9
 " The Greek Artist Vangelis Rinas "Endless Sailing III" exhibition opening, Artonline, 23 April 2010
 "Greek Artist Rinas: Chinese Ideograms carving the Wooden Symbol of Cultural Expansion" China News, 9 March 2010
Endless Sailing III National Art Museum of China. Catalogue. Beijing, China: China Federation of Literary and Art Circles Publishing Co., March 2010
Liang Yeqian, "Greek Painter Rinas" Xinhua News Agency, 3 March 2010
 "The First Greek Painter Rinas' Exhibition in the National Art Museum", 9 March 2010
 "The Greek Artist Vangelis Rinas "Endless Sailing III" exhibition opening", Finance 17ok, 10 March 2010
Nikos Vatopoulos, "A Tale of two Countries' Friendship", Ekathimerini, 3 March 2010
Vangelis Rinas from Greece holds solo exhibition, National Art Museum of China News, March 2010
 "The first Greek painter works visit the National Art Museum of China", News.99ys, March 2010
 "The First Greek Painter works visit the National Art Museum of China", macauart.net, March 2010
 "The first Greek painter works visit the National Art Museum of China", Art.China, March 2010
National Art Museum of China Art Show, March 2010, no.3 
Katerina Zaharopoulou, "The Age of Images" ET-1 program, Greek TV, 15 March 2007
Vivi Vasilopoulou, "Traveling" Ependytis, 24 February 2010
Marilena Astrapelou, "A Long Journey with Canvas", Vimagazino, 21 February 2010, no. 488, 52–55
China Greece Times, Europe Weekly, 14 February 2010 no. 5
Myrto Raftopoulou, "Endless Sailing II", Efoplistis, April 2007, 124–127
Vangelis Rinas; Endless Sailing II. Catalogue. Athens, Greece: Skoufa Gallery, 2007
Phivi Paraskeva, "A Visual Journey in the World of Subconscious", Proto Thema, 3 April 2007
Visual Arts in Greece 2007-Artistic Innovation: Semiotics of its Terms in the New Age, Modern Greek Arts Archives, Catalogue. Salonika, Greece: State Museum of Contemporary Art, 2007, 157
Kyriakos Valavanis, Kritiki Logou kai Techis, 2007, no. 5
 "Boat in the Air", Eleftherotypia, 22 March 2002, 30
Vangelis Rinas: Endless Sailing. Catalogue. Athens, Greece: March 2002
 "If you ever see a boat in the land…", Ta Nea, 19 March 2002
Vangelis Rinas. Catalogue. Athens, Greece: March 2001
Panos Bailis, "The Hope does have a Face", Ta Nea, 18 February 1994  
Vangelis Rinas, Catalogue. Athens, Greece: Maria Papadopoulou Gallery, 1993
Vangelis Kechriotis, "Faces in a closed Room" Avgi, March 1993
Dimitris Mitropoulos, "Visual Athens Today" Tahydromos, 14 July 1993

Selected public collections
National Center for the Performing Arts (The Opera of Beijing), Beijing, China 
Beijing International Art Biennale Collection, Beijing, China
Hellenic Parliament, Athens, Greece
National Bank of Greece, London 
Commercial Bank of Greece, Athens, Greece
Municipal Gallery of Corfu Island, Greece
Municipal Gallery of Viannos, Crete Island, Greece

References

1966 births
Living people
Greek painters
Greek sculptors
People from Icaria